François D'Haene (born 24 December 1985 in Lille) is a French elite athlete who specializes in ultra running and mountain running.

He won the Ultra-Trail du Mont-Blanc in 2012, 2014, 2017 and 2021. and the Grand Raid on Réunion in the Indian Ocean in 2013, 2014 and 2016. He is the winner of the first Ultra-Trail World Tour, in 2014. He holds the speed record for the Ultra Trail du Mont Blanc (UTMB), 167 km in 20 h 11 min 44 sec, a record that he improved in 2017 (170 km in 19 h 01 min 32 s). He's also known for being the fastest on the GR20 in Corsica, crossing it in 31 h 06 min.

On October 17, 2017, he set a new record on the John Muir Trail in California's Sierra Nevada, finishing it in 2 days, 19 hours, and 26 minutes.
 
On July 17th, 2021, D'Haene won the Hardrock 100 mile ultramarathon in 21:45:51; breaking both the counter clockwise and overall record, both previously held by Kilian Jornet.

He used to be a physiotherapist, and became a wine-grower in 2012. He is married and has three children, and lives in the Beaujolais winemaking region.

External links
Personal website

References

Living people
French male mountain runners
French ultramarathon runners
French sky runners
1985 births